Encyclia incumbens is a species of orchid.

incumbens